Melchior Anderegg (28 March 1828 – 8 December 1914), from Zaun, Meiringen, was a Swiss mountain guide and the first ascensionist of many prominent mountains in the western Alps during the golden and silver ages of alpinism. His clients were mostly British, the most famous of whom was Leslie Stephen, the writer, critic and mountaineer; Anderegg also climbed extensively with members of the Walker family, including Horace Walker and Lucy Walker, and with Florence Crauford Grove. His cousin Jakob Anderegg was also a well-known guide.

Alpine guide
First ascents by Melchior Anderegg
Wildstrubel, 3,243 m (Bernese Alps), 11 September 1858
Rimpfischhorn, 4,199 m (Pennine Alps), 9 September 1859
Alphubel, 4,206 m (Pennine Alps), 9 August 1860
Blüemlisalphorn, 3,664 m (Bernese Alps), 27 August 1860
Monte Disgrazia, 3,678 m (Bregaglia Range), 23 August 1862
Dent d'Hérens, 4,171 m (Pennine Alps), 12 August 1863
Parrotspitze, 4,432 m (Pennine Alps), 16 August 1863
Balmhorn, 3,698 m (Bernese Alps), 21 July 1864
Zinalrothorn, 4,221 m (Pennine Alps), 22 August 1864
Grandes Jorasses, 4,208 m (Mont Blanc Massif), 30 June 1868

Other noteworthy climbs by Melchior Anderegg
Mont Blanc, 4,809 m, via the Bosses du Dromedaire (1859)
Mont Blanc via the Dôme du Goûter (1861)
Solo reconnaissance up the Zmuttgrat of the Matterhorn (Pennine Alps) (1863)
Mont Blanc via the Brenva face (1865)
Winter traverse of the Finsteraarhorn, 4,273 m (Bernese Alps) (1866)
Civetta, 3,220 m (Dolomites) (1867)
Winter ascent of the Plattenhörner (1869)
First winter ascent of the Galenstock, 3,586 m (Urner Alps) (1877)

Wood carver
Anderegg was also a professional wood carver and owned a shop in Zermatt that sold his carvings (of bears, groups of chamois, and eagles, amongst other subjects), as well as 'Photographs of all the great peaks around Zermatt', alpenstocks, snow spectacles ('blue, green, and neutral tint') and Whymper's guides.

References

External links
 Photograph of Melchior Anderegg with Leslie and Julia Stephen, 1889

1828 births
1914 deaths
Alpine guides
People from Interlaken-Oberhasli District
Swiss mountain climbers